Acanthurinae is a subfamily of fish belonging to the family Acanthuridae, including 55 species in four genera.

Description
Among the species of the genera Acanthurus and Zebrasoma there are small anatomical differences: the first are disc-shaped and have a crescent-shaped tail, while the Zebrasoma species have ovaloid profile and a protruding muzzle.

The fry is transparent and has 13 venomous spines on the spine. The appearance changes when the specimen reaches the size of about 10 cm.

Like all species of the family Acanthuridae, Acanthurinae have a retractable spine on the caudal peduncle. It is very sharp (as a lancet) and it is used as an extreme defense. To emphasize the importance of this spine many species have showy aposematic colors in the caudal peduncle (or even directly a colored lancet).

Species

Acanthurus achilles
Acanthurus albipectoralis
Acanthurus auranticavus
Acanthurus bahianus
Acanthurus bariene
Acanthurus blochii
Acanthurus chirurgus
Acanthurus chronixis
Acanthurus coeruleus
Acanthurus dussumieri
Acanthurus fowleri
Acanthurus gahhm
Acanthurus grammoptilus
Acanthurus guttatus
Acanthurus japonicus
Acanthurus leucocheilus
Acanthurus leucopareius
Acanthurus leucosternon
Acanthurus lineatus
Acanthurus maculiceps
Acanthurus mata
Acanthurus monroviae
Acanthurus nigricans
Acanthurus nigricauda
Acanthurus nigrofuscus
Acanthurus nigroris
Acanthurus nubilus
Acanthurus olivaceus
Acanthurus polyzona
Acanthurus pyroferus
Acanthurus randalli
Acanthurus reversus
Acanthurus sohal
Acanthurus tennentii
Acanthurus thompsoni
Acanthurus triostegus
Acanthurus tristis
Acanthurus xanthopterus
Ctenochaetus binotatus
Ctenochaetus cyanocheilus
Ctenochaetus flavicauda
Ctenochaetus hawaiiensis
Ctenochaetus marginatus
Ctenochaetus striatus
Ctenochaetus strigosus
Ctenochaetus tominiensis
Ctenochaetus truncatus
Paracanthurus hepatus
Zebrasoma desjardinii
Zebrasoma flavescens
Zebrasoma gemmatum
Zebrasoma rostratum
Zebrasoma scopas
Zebrasoma veliferum
Zebrasoma xanthurum

References
FishBase

Bibliography
 Joseph S. Nelson: Fishes of the World. John Wiley & Sons, 2006, 
 André Luty: Doktorfische - Lebensweise - Pflege - Arten. Dähne Verlag, Ettlingen 1999, 
 Andreas Vilcinskas: Meerestiere der Tropen, Franckh-Kosmos Verlag, Stuttgart 2000, 
 Helmut Debelius und Rudie H. Kuiter: Doktorfische und ihre Verwandten. Ulmer Verlag Stuttgart 2002, 

Acanthuridae
Ray-finned fish subfamilies